Venzon is a surname. Notable people with the surname include:

Mericien Venzon (born 1991), Filipino figure skater
Tony Venzon (1915–1971), American baseball player and umpire

See also
Venson